is a railway station in Higashi-ku, Nagoya, Aichi Prefecture, Japan.

It provides access to Nagoya Dome, where baseball games and various other large public events are held in Nagoya.

Lines

 (Station number: M13)
Nagoya Guideway Bus
Yutorīto Line (Station number: Y02)

Layout

Nagoya Municipal Subway

Platforms

Nagoya Guideway Bus

Platforms

Adjacent stations

|-
!colspan=5|Nagoya Guideway Bus

References

External links
 

Railway stations in Japan opened in 2000
Railway stations in Aichi Prefecture